Hendy is a village in the community of Llanedi, Carmarthenshire, Wales. It is situated at the Carmarthenshire and the City and County of Swansea border. It lies on the Afon Gwili just across the River Loughor from Pontarddulais. Together with Fforest to the north, it forms part of a continuous built-up area centred on Pontarddulais. Most of the village sits between the M4 Motorway junction 48 and the A48 road (Fforest Road) north of the motorway.

Origin of name
Yr Hendy, originally a farm name meaning the old house, cognate with hendre, the main home.

Notable people 
 John Jenkins (1872–1936), a Welsh poet and theologian; bardic name of Gwili
 Dai Hiddlestone (1890–1973), a Welsh international rugby union player who played for Neath RFC
 Bryn Howells (1911–1983), a Welsh rugby union, and professional rugby league footballer
 Terry Price (1945–1993), an international rugby union, and professional rugby league footballer
 Geraint the Snakeman (born ca.1975), a TV personality who work with reptiles, real name Geraint Wyn Hopkins

References

Villages in Carmarthenshire